Robert Zimmermann may refer to:

 Robert Zimmermann (painter) (1815–1864), landscape painter
 Robert Zimmermann (footballer) (born 1963), former German football player
 Robert Zimmermann (cyclist) (1912–2006), Swiss cyclist
 Robert Zimmermann (bobsleigh) (1934–2012), Swiss bobsledder
 Robert von Zimmermann (1824–1898), Czech-born Austrian philosopher

See also
 Robert Zimmerman (disambiguation)